Spiritual Plague is an American symphonic-rock band from Vancouver, Washington, United States.
The band released their debut EP in 2009, titled The Exodus, that led to attention from record labels, talent scouts, radio stations, and music promoters. In 2010, Spiritual Plague opened for GRITS. Shortly after that, they headlined performances at The Hawthorne Theater in Portland, Oregon. In 2011, they performed at the Uprising Youth Conference in Eugene, Oregon, opening for Paul Wright. In 2013, they opened for Avenged Sevenfold, Van Halen, Godsmack, Chevelle, Buckcherry, Saliva, Sevendust at major rock festival, Rock USA.

Their music has been featured nationally on FM radio across the U.S, in Canada, and also Australia. Currently, Spiritual Plague is an indie band who records, produces and engineers all of their own music. They were also featured on John Doe Revolution, a music webzine based in Finland.

History
The band was founded in 2005 by Garrett Olmstead (drums) and his cousin Lyndon Lewis (guitars). They completed their lineup in 2007 when Lyndon's brother Preston Lewis (vocals) and his cousin Keith Lewis (keyboards) joined the band. Garrett's brother, James Olmstead (bass), retired from the band to pursue other endeavors but was soon replaced by Austin Grothe.

Band members
Current
 Preston Lewis – Lead vocalist
 Garrett Olmstead – Drums
 Lyndon Lewis- Guitar

References

External links

Hard rock musical groups from Washington (state)
Christian rock groups from Washington (state)
Musical groups established in 2005